Robert Bocking Stevens (8 June 1933 – 30 January 2021) was a British lawyer and academic.

Life
Stevens was educated at Oakham School and then at Keble College, Oxford, where he obtained his BA and BCL degrees.  He was called to the bar in 1956 as a member of Gray's Inn. In 1958, he was awarded an LLM from Yale University. He then became a member of staff there, rising from assistant professor (1959–61) to associate professor (1961–65) and finally to professor (1965–76).  He was then Provost of Tulane University, Louisiana from 1976 to 1978, when he became President of Haverford College, Pennsylvania, leaving there in 1987 to become Chancellor of the University of California, Santa Cruz. He left Santa Cruz in 1991, and in 1993 returned to England to take up office as Master of Pembroke College, Oxford. He was on the governing body of Abingdon School from 1994 to 2001.

He left the college in 2001, and was appointed an Honorary Fellow.  Since 2001, he was a senior research fellow at the Constitution Unit of University College London.

His writings include The Restrictive Practices Court (1965), In Search of Justice (1968), Welfare Medicine in America (1974), The American Law School (1983) and The English Judges (2002).

His children with his first wife, Rosemary A. Stevens, are Carey Stevens and Richard Stevens. He was married to Kathie Booth Stevens (born 16 December 1948), a retired educator, art historian, and magistrate, until his death at Oxford in January 2021. Their daughter is the children's novelist Robin Stevens.

References

External links
 Robert B. Stevens Papers (MS 1686). Manuscripts and Archives, Yale University Library.

2021 deaths
1933 births
Alumni of Keble College, Oxford
Members of Gray's Inn
British barristers
Yale University alumni
Yale University faculty
Tulane University faculty
Haverford College faculty
Chancellors of the University of California, Santa Cruz
Masters of Pembroke College, Oxford
Academics of University College London
Presidents of Haverford College
Governors of Abingdon School